Luana Patten (July 6, 1938 – May 1, 1996) was an American actress who appeared in films produced by Walt Disney Pictures, such as Song of the South (1946), Fun and Fancy Free (1947), and Melody Time (1948). Later in life, she played roles in television.

Early years
Patten was born in Long Beach, California, to Harvey T. Patten and Alma (née Miller) Patten, natives of Enid, Oklahoma. She attended Burbank High School and Hollywood Professional School.

Career
At the age of three she was a model and later was hired by Walt Disney. Patten made her first film appearance in the 1946 musical Song of the South with Bobby Driscoll. They also appeared together in Song of the South'''s sister film So Dear to My Heart.

In 1947, she appeared again with Edgar Bergen, Charlie McCarthy, and Mortimer Snerd during the live action scenes in Fun and Fancy Free. She appeared with Bobby Driscoll in the Pecos Bill segment of Disney's Melody Time. When she grew up, she played Jody Weaver in Joe Dakota and Priscilla Lapham in Disney's 1957 Johnny Tremain. In 1958, Patten portrayed Elizabeth Buckley in the episode "Twelve Guns" of NBC's Cimarron City western television series. It was on Cimarron City that she met her future second husband, John Smith. They married on June 4, 1960, and divorced on December 4, 1964.

In 1959, she played Abbie Fenton in the episode "Call Your Shot" of Wanted: Dead or Alive, starring Steve McQueen.  In that same year, she played Betty in "The Exploding Book", season 7, episode 21 of "The Adventures of Ozzie and Harriet" that aired on March 4, 1959; and she played Ruth in "The Ruth Marshall Story" season 3, episode 13 of Wagon Train that aired on December 30, 1959.   She also appeared as Natalie Garner in "The Hunter Malloy Story" season 2, episode 16 of Wagon Train that aired on January 21, 1959.  In the 1960 Season 2, Episode 13 of Rawhide "Incident Of The Druid Curse", she played a dual role of sisters Maeve and Mona Lismore.  In 1960, she played Libby Halstead in Vincente Minnelli's Home from the Hill. In 1966, she played saloon girl Lorna Medford in the episode "Credit for a Kill" of Bonanza. In 1966, she had a small part as Nora White, the new bride of Whitey in Follow Me, Boys!. She also appeared in A Thunder of Drums, and the Rawhide episode "Incident of the Druid Curse" on CBS. That year she also appeared on Perry Mason as defendant Cynthia Perkins in "The Case of the Scarlet Scandal".    She also played Mindy McGurney in the television series F Troop, as the daughter of a candidate for mayor, season 2, episode 8,  "The Ballot of Corporal Agarn" that aired on October 27, 1966.  She appeared as various characters in three episodes of Dragnet between 1967 and 1970. She appeared in the Adam-12 "Log 94: Vengeance" that aired March 7, 1970. She then retired from the film and television industry except for a brief cameo in the 1988 film Grotesque''.

Death
Patten died from respiratory failure at Long Beach Memorial Hospital, aged 57. She is interred in Forest Lawn Memorial Park in Long Beach, California.

Filmography

References

External links

 
 

1938 births
1996 deaths
20th-century American actresses
American film actresses
American child actresses
Deaths from respiratory failure
Disney people
Actresses from Long Beach, California
Burials at Forest Lawn Memorial Park (Long Beach)